Lesjöfors is a locality situated in Filipstad Municipality, Värmland County, Sweden with 1,062 inhabitants in 2010.

Located in the Bergslagen area, where mining and metal preparation historically was the leading industry, the town grew up around the local industry (bruk) founded there in 1642.

Lesjöfors was the site of the International Youth Congress of Esperanto in 2003.

It is famous within Sweden for bandy and has produced many players for the Sweden national bandy team.

It has hosted a stage of the Swedish rally.

References

External links 
Lesjöfors Info
Lesjöfors Museum
Lesjöfors Industry

Populated places in Värmland County
Populated places in Filipstad Municipality
Swedish Rally